This article is about the demographic features of the population of Liechtenstein, including population density, ethnicity, education level, health of the populace, economic status, religious affiliations and other aspects of the population.

Liechtenstein is the fourth smallest country of Europe, after the Vatican City, Monaco, and San Marino. Its population is primarily ethnic Alemannic, although a third of its resident population are foreign nationals, primarily German speakers from the Federal Republic of Germany, Austria, and the Swiss Confederation, other Swiss, Italians, and Turks. Nationals are referred to by the plural: Liechtensteiners.

The official language is German; most speak Alemannic, a German dialect highly divergent from Standard German, but closely related to those dialects spoken in neighbouring regions. 
In Triesenberg a quite distinct dialect promoted by the municipality is spoken. According to the 2000 census, 87.9% of the population is Christian, of which 76% adhere to the Roman Catholic faith, while about 7% are Protestant. The religious affiliation for most of the remainder is Islam - 4.8%, undeclared - 4.1%, and no religion - 2.8%.

Population

2019
Resident population by municipalities as of 30 June 2019.

66.2% are Liechtensteiners, the rest are foreigners.

Vital statistics since 1901

Ethnic groups
Alemannic Germans 86%, Italians, Turks, Albanians, Yugoslavs, and others 14%.

Languages

Religions

CIA World Factbook demographic statistics 

The following demographic statistics are from the CIA World Factbook, unless otherwise indicated.

Age structure:
0–14 years: 16.1% (male 2,809/female 2,856)
15–64 years: 69% (male 11,970/female 12,326)
65 years and over: 15% (male 2,304/female 2,971) (2011 est.)

Sex ratio:
at birth: 1.26 male(s)/female
under 15 years: 1.09 male(s)/female
15–64 years: 1 male(s)/female
65 years and over: 0.81 male(s)/female
total population: 0.98 male(s)/female (2011 est.)

Infant mortality rate: 4.4 deaths/1,000 live births (2011 est.)

Life expectancy at birth: (14 in the world)
total population: 81.5 years
male: 79.37 years
female: 84.19 years (2011 est.)

Total fertility rate: 1.69 children born/woman (2011 est.)

HIV/AIDS - adult prevalence rate: N/A%

HIV/AIDS - people living with HIV/AIDS: N/A

HIV/AIDS - deaths: N/A

Nationality:
noun: Liechtensteiner(s)
adjective: Liechtenstein

Languages: German (official), Italian, Turkish, English (Spoken, not official)

Literacy: (1 in the world)
definition: age 10 and over can read and write
total population: 100%
male: 100%
female: 100%

See also
Languages of Liechtenstein
Turks in Liechtenstein

References

External links
Amt für Volkswirtschaft (Office of Economic Affairs)

 
Geography of Liechtenstein